The 2018–19 Montenegrin Cup was the 13th season of the football tournament in Montenegro. The cup began on 28 August 2018 and ended on 30 May 2019. The winners of this competition earned a place in the UEFA Europa League.

OFK Titograd won the previous season's tournament (under the name Mladost Podgorica), and were the defending champions. The club defeated Igalo in the final by the score of 2–0.

Format
Twenty–six clubs participated in the competition this season. The first round and the final were contested over one leg with all other rounds being contested over two legs.

First round
Draw for the first round was held on 23 August 2018. The first round matches were played on 28–30 August 2018.

Summary

|}

Matches

Second round
Draw for the second round was held on 24 September 2018. Fourteen clubs competed in the second round played over two legs from 3 to 24 October 2018.

Summary

|}

First legs

Second legs

Quarter-finals
Draw for the quarter-finals was held on 29 October 2018. The quarter-finals were played from 7 to 28 November 2018.

Summary

|}

First legs

Second legs

Semi-finals
Draw for the semi-finals was held on 8 April 2019. The semi-finals were played from 17 April to 1 May 2019.

Summary

|}

First legs

Second legs

Final

See also
 Montenegrin Cup
 Montenegrin First League

References

External links
Montenegrin Cup 2018-2019 at Football Association of Montenegro's official site
Montenegrin Cup 2018-2019 at Soccerway

Montenegrin Cup seasons
Montenegro
Cup